Kazazis is a Greek surname. Notable people with the surname include: 

 Dimitrios Kazazis (born 1966), Greek volleyball player and coach
 Neoklis Kazazis (1849–1936), Greek lawyer, university professor, and writer

Greek-language surnames